A Bothered Mind is the thirteenth and final studio album from American blues musician R. L. Burnside. It was the last release from the musician prior to his death in 2005.

Following a heart attack in 2001, Burnside ceased to drink alcohol at a doctor's request. Following this, he had difficulty playing music, stating he felt like he had to learn all over again. As such, much of A Bothered Mind used older recordings of Burnside playing the guitar. When asked in 2003 to share his thoughts on previous albums that Fat Possum had remixed and released on his behalf, he replied "At first I didn't like them too much, then I saw how much money they were making and I got to liking them pretty well".

Track listing
All tracks written by R. L. Burnside, except where noted.

Personnel

Musicians
R. L. Burnside - Composer, guitar, vocals
Jimmy Bones - Harmonica, harp, keyboards, piano
Kenny Brown - Guitar, slide guitar
Cedric Burnside - Drums
John Scott Evans - Saxophone
Martin Gross - Drums, Guitar, Mixing, Producing
Mike Hollis - Bass guitar
Kid Rock - Vocals
Lyrics Born - Vocals, various instruments
Kenny Olson - Guitar, bass guitar
Mike Smith - Guitar, bass guitar

Production
Matthew Johnson - Producer
Bruce Watson - Producer, mixing
Tom Shimura - Producer, arrangements
George Mitchell - Engineer
Mike E. Clark - Mixing
Scott Sumner - Mixing
Mark Yoshida - Mastering

Charts

References

2004 albums
R. L. Burnside albums
Fat Possum Records albums